Mézec is a surname, and may refer to;

Mézec derives from mezeg which means physician in Breton. (cf. Mezeg)

 Bruno Le Mézec - British/Breton archaeologist
 Sam Mézec - British politician and deputy of Saint Helier
 Pierre Le Mézec - Former mayor of Tressignaux
 Pascale Le Mezec - French cattle geneticist
 Jeanne Le Mézec - Breton writer
 Tanguy Le Mezec - Breton politician, spokesman of Parti Chrétien-Démocrate Bretagne
 Mathias le Mézec - Breton pianist.

References

External links
Distribution of the surname Mezec in France

Breton-language surnames
Occupational surnames